The 19019 / 19020 Bandra Terminus–Haridwar Dehradun Express is an express train of Indian Railways Western Railway Zone that runs between  and  in India on a daily basis. Initially it ran between Dehradun and Bandra Terminus, but now it runs only between Haridwar & Bandra Terminus as Dehradun Express. 

It operates as train number 19019 from Bandra Terminus to Haridwar and as train number 19020 in the reverse direction.

Coaches

The train has standard ICF rakes with max speed of 110 kmph. The train consists of 22 coaches:

 1 AC First
 2 AC Two Tier 
 6 AC Three tier
 8 Sleeper Class
 2 General Unreserved
 1 Luggage Cum Disabled Coaches
 1 Generator Car 
 1 High Capacity Parcel Van

Coach Position

The train consists of 24 coaches.

Service

It is a daily train and covers the distance of 1617 kilometres in 32 hours 15 mins as 19019 Dehradun Express (40.53 km/hr) and 32 hours 45 mins as 19020 Dehradun Express (40.29 km/hr).

Traction

Before the Mumbai region changed traction to an AC system, a WCAM-1 engine would haul the train until  from where a Vadodara-based WAP-4 or WAP-5 would take over until  after which a WDM-3A engine from the Tuglakabad shed would take over until Haridwar.

Since Western Railways switched over to AC traction, a Ghaziabad-based WAP-7 hauls the train until Hazrat Nizamuddin after which a WDM-3A engine from the Tuglakabad shed takes over until Haridwar.

Now, both trains are hauled by a Ghaziabad-based WAP-7 / WAP-5 until Haridwar and vice versa.

Schedule

 19019 Bandra Terminus–Haridwar Dehradun Express leaves Bandra Terminus every day at 00:05AM IST and reaches Haridwar at 08:20AM IST on the next day.
 19020 Haridwar–Bandra Terminus Dehradun Express leaves Haridwar every day at 01:30PM IST and reaches Bandra Terminus at 10:15PM IST on the next day.

Route & Halts

The important halts of the train are:

Incidents
On 8 January 2014, a fire broke out on one of the trains when it was near Dahanu station in Maharashtra. Three carriages were involved. Some passengers escaped "by breaking open the back doors"
but nine were killed.

References

External links
 Dehradun Express

Transport in Mumbai
Trains from Dehradun
Rail transport in Gujarat
Rail transport in Madhya Pradesh
Rail transport in Haryana
Express trains in India